The  is a  single-track railway line in Tokyo, Japan, operated by the private railway operator Seibu Railway.

The line is part of the Seibu Shinjuku group of railway lines that connects suburban areas of western Tokyo to Seibu and JR East main lines that extend to central Tokyo. Since July 2008, recorded announcements on trains have been provided in English in addition to Japanese and, as part of Seibu Railway's ongoing refurbishment programme, signage and maps at stations are also bilingual.

Stations

Operation

Connections
This line connects the suburban Seibu lines with the  JR Chūō line at Kokubunji. At Hagiyama, there is transfer to the  Seibu Haijima Line. The Seibu Yamaguchi Line, also known as the Leo Liner, connects Tamako Station with Seibuen Amusement park and the Seibu Dome, home of the Saitama Seibu Lions baseball team. Ōmekaidō Station is listed as a connection to services on the  JR Musashino Line at Shin-Kodaira Station, a short walk away.

The Tamako Line also provides access to the National Center of Neurology and Psychiatry and the International Campus of Hitotsubashi Gakuen University from Hagiyama and Hitotsubashi-Gakuen stations respectively.

History

The Tamako Railway opened the Kokubunji to Hagiyama section in 1928, and extended it to Musashi-Yamato in 1930, electrifying the entire section at 600 V DC at the same time. The company was absorbed into the Seibu Railway system on 12 March 1940.　In 1961, the line was extended to Seibu-yūenchi (now Tamako), and the voltage increased to 1,500 V DC at the same time.

References
This article incorporates material from the corresponding article in the Japanese Wikipedia.

External links
Seibu Railway route map

 
Tamako Line
Railway lines in Tokyo
Western Tokyo
1067 mm gauge railways in Japan
Railway lines opened in 1928